Curtis Fuller Meets Roma Jazz Trio is an album by trombonist Curtis Fuller which was recorded in Italy in 1982 and released on the Dutch Timeless label.

Track listing 
 "Impressions" (John Coltrane) – 6:38
 "R.E.D.'s Delights" (Curtis Fuller) – 6:49
 "Jazz Island" (Fuller) – 5:42
 "Naima" (Coltrane) – 8:19
 "Afternoon in Paris (John Lewis) – 6:41
 "Blue Bossa" (Kenny Dorham) – 5:15

Personnel 
Curtis Fuller – trombone
Danilo Rea – piano 
Enzo Pietropaoli – bass
Roberto Gatto – drums

References 

Curtis Fuller albums
1984 albums
Timeless Records albums